Luiz Carlos Barreto (born 20 May 1928) is a Brazilian film producer and screenwriter. He has produced 50 films since 1962. He produced the 1966 film The Priest and the Girl, which was entered into the 16th Berlin International Film Festival. He also produced the 1969 film Brazil Year 2000, which won a Silver Bear at the 19th Berlin International Film Festival.

Selected filmography
 Garrincha: Hero of the Jungle (1962)
 Vidas Secas (1963)
 The Priest and the Girl (1966)
 Antonio das Mortes (1969)
 Brazil Year 2000 (1969)
 How Tasty Was My Little Frenchman (1971)
 Dona Flor and Her Two Husbands (1976)
 Bye Bye Brazil (1979)
 Memoirs of Prison (1984)
 Four Days in September (1997)
 Bossa Nova (2000)

References

External links

1928 births
Living people
Brazilian film producers
Brazilian screenwriters
People from Sobral, Ceará